Dally may refer to:

Surname:
Ann Dally (1929–2007), English author and psychiatrist
Bill Dally, the Willard R. and Inez Kerr Bell Professor in the Stanford University School of Engineering
Clarence Madison Dally (1865–1904), American glassblower, assistant to Thomas Edison
Craig Dally, Republican member of the Pennsylvania House of Representatives for the 138th District
Frederick Dally (1838–1914), English Canadian photographer
Hans Dally (1916–1997), highly decorated Hauptmann in the Luftwaffe during World War II
Marcelin Dally (born 1962), retired Côte d'Ivoire hurdler
William Dally (1908–1996), American rower who competed in the 1928 Summer Olympics

Given name:
Dally Duncan (1909–1990), Aberdeen-born football player and manager
Dally Messenger (1883–1959), Australian rugby union and rugby league footballer
Dally O'Brien (1918–1996), Australian rules footballer
Dally Randriantefy (born 1977), former professional female tennis player

Places:
Dally Castle, ruined 13th century stone motte and bailey fortress in Northumberland, England

Biochemistry:
Dally (gene), a gene that encodes an HS-modified proteoglycan in "Drosophila melanogaster"

Other:
Dally M Awards, the official annual player awards for the National Rugby League competition
Dally or Dallie is a generally neutral slang term for a Croatian New Zealander

See also
Dally in the Alley, Detroit's largest annual community festival